Linkem S.p.A. is an Italian telecommunications company specializing in wireless broadband connection (HiperLAN, WiMAX and Wi-Fi).

The company has a network of wholly owned subsidiaries with 1,200 antennas (BTS) located throughout Italy, providing Internet connectivity to surrounding areas. The Linkem network is an alternative to traditional telecommunications networks, allowing signal transmission to  areas that lack cellular connectivity.

The firm was Italy's first Wireless Internet Service Provider, serving  about 2,000 municipalities  covering 40% of Italy's land area.

History 
Linkem S.p.A. was founded in 2001 as Megabeam Italia S.p.A. Its founders include a group of managers supported by AngelVentures Serviços de Consultoria S.A., of Gianfilippo Cuneo. It was the first Italian Wireless Internet Service Provider, originally serving around 100 thousand users through a Wi-Fi network predominantly available in hotels, airports (including New York City JFK and London Heathrow), stations and service areas of the trunk A4 Milan-Brescia.

Telecom Italia indicated interest in the acquisition of Linkem for 11.5 million euros, but the Italian antitrust authorities required conditions the firm would not accept. Specifically, Telecom Italia would have had to separate wi-fi from all other services, give up all exclusive licenses held by itself as well as those held by Linkem, and grant competitors roaming access to the network, ending discriminatory pricing.

In 2005 the Linkem brand was created, and in June 2006 the company became Linkem S.p.A. In 2010 the company purchased Maxi-Com and Retelit.

In 2008, AFT S.p.A. (Linkem's parent company) won the notice of allocation for WiMAX frequency bands 3.4-3.6 GHz, in 13 Italian regions with their offer of 34,420,000 euros. With its WiMax service, Linkem reaches more than 80% of Italy's population - becoming the first Italian operator to launch a WiMax-based voice and broadband service.

In 2010 Telecom Italia developed an agreement with Linkem for the rent of its WiMax networks, offering free WiMax in the regions where Linkem has its own network.

By 2012, Linkem was serving a population of over 27 million residents.

2015 marked the activation of LTE coverage on 3.5 GHz frequencies (Linkem proprietary frequencies) with a campaign to replace outdoor WiMax antennas.

On 30 December 2021, Tiscali S.p.A. and Linkem S.p.A. approved the project for the merger by incorporation of Linkem Retail S.r.l. in Tiscali S.p.A.

On 27 April 2022, the shareholders' meetings of Tiscali and Linkem approved the merger between the two companies.

On 1 August 2022, the two companies completed the merger process: Tiscali S.p.A. integrated Linkem Retail S.r.l., with the consequent transfer of the branch to the subsidiary Tiscali Italia S.p.A., while Linkem S.p.A. became the majority shareholder of Tiscali S.p.A. (58.60%).

Ownership
In 2003 shareholders were reported to be Angel Ventures Serviços de Consultorio S.A. (42%), 2G Investments S.p.A. (28%), Cuneo & Associati S.r.l. (4%), Marco Airoldi (4%), Rocco Rosa (7%), Davide Rota (12%) and Ser-Fid Italian Trust and Audit S.p.A. (3%). In July 2009, the company A.F.T. S.p.A., which owns 100% of the share capital of Linkem S.p.A., was owned by several investment funds, including Ramius Capital Group, Vintage Investment, Leucadia, and 2G investments.

Communication and sponsorships 
 Testimonial 2012–2013 in planning national TV: Belen Rodriguez and Francesca Piccinini
 Technology partner Fipav 
 Title sponsor of the Italian club (Linkem Club Italy) 2009–2010 
 Official sponsor of the 'Foggia Calcio for the Pro League championship 2010–2011 
 Official sponsor Avezzano Rugby 2011–2012 
 Official sponsor Messina Volleyball 2011–2012 
 Official sponsor of the San Nicola stadium in Bari 2012–2013 
 Official sponsor of the basketball team Linkem NPC Rieti 2012–2013 
 Official sponsor PlayOff Volleyball male Serie A 2012–2013

References

External links 

 

Companies based in Rome
Telecommunications companies established in 1999
Internet service providers of Italy
Italian brands
Telecommunications companies of Italy